Coup de Grâce is a 1939 novel in French by Marguerite Yourcenar. The narrative is a triangle drama set in the Baltics during the Russian Civil War (1917-1922).

It was adapted into the 1976 film Coup de Grâce, directed by Volker Schlöndorff.

See also
 1939 in literature
 20th-century French literature

References

External links
 Coup de Grâce at the publisher's website 

1939 French novels
Novels by Marguerite Yourcenar
Novels set in the Russian Revolution
Novels set during the Russian Civil War
Belgian novels adapted into films
French novels adapted into films
Éditions Gallimard books